Phước Hội may refer to several places in Vietnam, including:

Phước Hội, Bình Thuận, a ward of La Gi
Phước Hội, Bà Rịa–Vũng Tàu, a commune of Đất Đỏ District